The Château d'Avranches was a castle in Avranches, Manche, France.

A castle has existed at Avranches since the 10th century. It was besieged by Francis I, Duke of Brittany, and Arthur de Richemont, with the English garrison surrendering on 12 May 1450. All that remains of it is a portion of the ramparts.

References
Michel Hébert et André Gervaise. Châteaux et Manoirs de la Manche. Condé-sur-Noireau, Éditions Charles Corlet, 2003

Castles in Manche